Modderpoort Dam is a combined buttress & earth-fill type dam located on the Rietfontein River, near Beaufort West, Northern Cape, South Africa. It was established in 1953 and serves primarily for irrigation purposes. The hazard potential of the dam has been ranked significant (2).

See also
List of reservoirs and dams in South Africa
List of rivers of South Africa

References 

 List of South African Dams from the Department of Water Affairs and Forestry (South Africa)

Dams in South Africa
Dams completed in 1953